Rodman may refer to:

Places in the United States
 Rodman, Iowa
 Rodman, New York, a town
 Rodman (CDP), New York, a hamlet in the town
 Rodman Mountains, California
 Rodman Reservoir, Florida

People

Surname
 Alex Rodman (born 1987), English footballer
 Blair Rodman, professional poker player
 David Rodman (born 1983), Slovenian ice hockey player
 Dennis Rodman (born 1961), former NBA basketball player
 DJ Rodman (born 2001), American basketball player and son of Dennis Rodman
 Hugh Rodman (1859–1940), American admiral
 Howard A. Rodman (19??), American screenwriter, author and professor
 Isaac P. Rodman, American Civil War Union brigadier general
 John Rodman (1775–1847), New York County District Attorney
 Judy Rodman, American country music singer
 Marcel Rodman (born 1981), Slovenian ice hockey player
 Peter W. Rodman (1943-2008), Brookings Institution Senior Fellow
 Peter S. Rodman (born 1945), primatologist at UC Davis
 Samuel Rodman (1898-?), Soviet WW II spy
 Thomas Jackson Rodman (1816–1871), Union general
 Trinity Rodman (born 2002), American soccer player and daughter of Dennis Rodman
 Victor Rodman (1892–1965), American actor
 William Rodman (Pennsylvania politician) (1757–1824), member of the U.S. House of Representatives from Pennsylvania
 William B. Rodman (1817–1893), lawyer, North Carolina Supreme Court judge
 William B. Rodman, Jr. (1889–1976), North Carolina state Senator, state Attorney General, and state Supreme Court judge
 William M. Rodman  (1814–1868), tailor and 7th mayor of Providence, Rhode Island

First name
 Rodman Philbrick, writer
 Rodman McCamley Price (1816–1894), American politician, Governor of New Jersey
 Rodman Rockefeller (1932–2000), businessman, eldest son of Nelson Rockefeller
 Rodman "Rod" Serling, television host
 Rodman Wanamaker, businessman

Other
 Rodman gun, American Civil War cannon
 USS Rodman (DD-456), American destroyer named after Admiral Hugh Rodman
 Surveyor's assistant who handles the Level staff

See also
 Justice Rodman (disambiguation)